Alistair Roger Ginley (born 5 November 1978) is a rally driver from England.

He started rallying in 1999. Alistair scored points in the 2003 and 2004 World Rally Championship seasons, both at Cyprus Rally.

References 

1978 births
World Rally Championship drivers
English rally drivers
Living people